A safe water mark, as defined by the International Association of Lighthouse Authorities, is a sea mark used in maritime pilotage to indicate the end of a channel.  They usually imply that open, deep and safe water lies ahead. They are also used to indicate the start and end of a buoyed section of a continuous narrow channel; and a series of them may mark a safe route through shallow areas.  It is therefore important to consult appropriate charts to determine their meaning in each location. They are also known as fairway buoys and clear water buoys.

They are recognisable by their red-and-white vertical stripes, and commonly bear a top sign in shape of a red ball. They either flash Morse code "A" (di-dah), or one long flash, occulting (more light than dark) or isophase (equal light and dark) every 10 seconds (L Fl 10s).

In the United States, safe water marks are printed with the initials of their associated waterways or localities.

See also

 Navigation
Lateral mark
Cardinal mark
Isolated danger mark
Special mark

References

Navigational buoys